Jo Eisinger (1909–1991) was a film and television writer whose career spanned more than 40 years from the early 1940s well into the 1980s. He is widely recognized as the writer of two of the most psychologically complex film noirs, Gilda (1946) and Night and the City (1950).

His credits also include The Sleeping City (1950) and Crime of Passion (1957), a coda to the films of the noir style, for which he wrote the story as well as the screenplay. Starring Barbara Stanwyck, it's a strikingly modern commentary about how women were driven mad by the limitations imposed upon them in the postwar period.

Jo Eisinger started writing for radio penning numerous segments for The Adventures of Sam Spade series.  He returned to thriller and private eye adventure series writing for the ITC television series Danger Man (1960–61) and the mid-1980s HBO series Philip Marlowe, Private Eye. His script for an episode of the latter show, "The Pencil", earned him a 1984 Edgar Award.

Eisinger's credits also include several films that departed from his accustomed genres of  mystery, adventure and crime. Among them are Oscar Wilde (1960), starring  Robert Morley and Sir Ralph Richardson, The Rover (1967), from the novel by Joseph Conrad and starring Rita Hayworth and Anthony Quinn, and  The Jigsaw Man (1983), starring Laurence Olivier and directed by Terence Young.

Eisinger wrote the books on which the Broadway plays What Big Ears! (1942) and A Point of Honor (1937) were based. His novel The Walls Came Tumbling Down (1943) was adapted for the long-running radio drama program Suspense in 1944; the episode  featured screen and radio actors Keenan Wynn and Hans Conried. A film version of The Walls Came Tumbling Down starring  Edgar Buchanan and George Macready was released in 1946.

Jo Eisinger's second marriage was to Lorain Beaumont. Eisinger used his wife's maiden name for Mr. Beaumont, one of the characters in The Walls Came Tumbling Down.

Filmography 
Screenplays
 The Spider (1945), based on a play by Fulton Oursler and Lowell Brentano
 Gilda (1946), based on a story by E. A. Ellington
 Night and the City (1950), based on the novel Night and the City by Gerald Kersh
 The Sleeping City (1950)
 The System (1953), based on a story by Edith Grafton and Samuel Grafton
 Bedevilled (1955)
 Crime of Passion (1957)
 The Big Boodle (1957), based on a novel by Robert Sylvester
 The House of the Seven Hawks (1959), based on a novel by Victor Canning
 As the Sea Rages (1959), based on a novel by Werner Helwig
 Mistress of the World (1960), remake of a 1919 silent film
 Oscar Wilde (1960), based on the play Oscar Wilde by Leslie Stokes and Sewell Stokes
 The Poppy Is Also a Flower (1966), based on a story by Ian Fleming
 The Rover (1967), based on the novel The Rover by Joseph Conrad
 The Scorpio Letters (1967), based on the novel The Scorpio Letters by Victor Canning
 They Came to Rob Las Vegas (1968), based on a novel by André Lay
 Cold Sweat (1970), based on a novel by Richard Matheson
 The Jigsaw Man (1983), based on a novel by Dorothea Bennett
Film Adaptation
 The Walls Came Tumbling Down (1946), based on Jo Eisinger's novel

References

External links
 
 

1909 births
1991 deaths
Edgar Award winners
American male screenwriters
American television writers
Place of birth missing
American male television writers
20th-century American male writers
20th-century American screenwriters